Tsagaantsoojiin Mönkh-Erdene (born 16 July 1992) is a Mongolian footballer who plays as a midfielder for Mongolian Premier League club Ulaanbaatar and the Mongolian national team. He made his first appearance for the Mongolia national football team in 2011.

International career

International goals
Scores and results list Mongolia's goal tally first.

References

1992 births
Living people
Mongolian footballers
Association football midfielders
Mongolia international footballers
Mongolian National Premier League players